"I Am Machine" is a song by Canadian rock band Three Days Grace. The song was released as a single on September 30, 2014. It is the second single off the band's fifth studio album Human.

Background
"I Am Machine" was written by Johnny Andrews, Neil Sanderson, Matt Walst, Barry Stock and Brad Walst while production was handled by Gavin Brown who also co-wrote the song. The song tells the story of someone wishing they could feel more and have emotions about their current state.

Lyric video
A lyric video for the song was released on their YouTube and Vevo channel on September 28, 2014. The video includes the band recording the song, while lyrics are shown over the video.

Accolades
The song was nominated for "Rock Song of the Year" at the 2016 iHeartRadio Music Awards. Billboard ranked the song at number 91 on their "Greatest of All Time Mainstream Rock Songs" list.

Charts

Weekly charts

Year-end charts

All-time charts

Certifications

References

2014 singles
Three Days Grace songs
Song recordings produced by Gavin Brown (musician)
2014 songs
Songs written by Gavin Brown (musician)
Songs written by Barry Stock
Songs written by Neil Sanderson